Mother Goose Lake is a 6.4 mile long lake located at head of King Salmon River, on the Alaska Peninsula, 21 miles south of Ugashik, Aleutian Range. It was named in 1923 by R. H. Sargent, USGS, as "suggested by its goose-like shape." According to Sargent, the local name was King gautham giri Lake. The lake lies entirely within the Alaska Peninsula National Wildlife Refuge.

Lakes of Lake and Peninsula Borough, Alaska
Lakes of Alaska
Aleutian Range